Som Prasad Pandey Member of Parliament, Ex-Minister of Industry.

A Nepali politician, belonging to the Communist Party of Nepal (Unified Socialist).
Member of Parliament.
Ex-minister of Industry and commerce.
Pandey won the Palpa-2 parliamentary seat in the 1994 election and the 1999 election. He served as the Chairman of Human Rights and
External Affairs Committee of the House of Representatives. In April 2008, he contested the Palpa-2 seat in the Constituent Assembly election, but was defeated by the Maoist candidate Lila Somai.

References

Living people
Communist Party of Nepal (Unified Socialist) politicians
Government ministers of Nepal
Nepal MPs 2017–2022
Nepal Communist Party (NCP) politicians
People from Palpa District
Members of the 2nd Nepalese Constituent Assembly
Nepal MPs 1994–1999
Nepal MPs 1999–2002
Communist Party of Nepal (Unified Marxist–Leninist) politicians
1956 births